Simon Diedong Dombo (1925–1998) was a Ghanaian politician, teacher and king. He was a Member of Parliament  that represented Jirapa-Lambussie District in the first Parliament of the first and second Republic of Ghana.

Early life and education 
Simon was born in 1925, He attended Government Teacher Training College Tamale where he obtained his Teachers' Training Certificate.

Career 
As the Douri-Na, he was reputed to be the first educated chieftain in the Upper Region of Ghana. He was one of the founders of the Northern People's Party. This later merged with the United Party.

Politics 
During the Second Republic, he was also a member of the first parliament under the membership of the ruling Progress Party. He was elected in the 1969 Ghanaian general elections. He was Minister for Health and then Minister for Interior in the Busia government.

He was banned from holding elected office by the Supreme Military Council prior to the 1979 elections. S. D. Dombo was among the early educated chieftains.

Personal life 
He was a Catholic Christian  and he had more than 30 children. He died on the 19th of March 1998.

See also
Busia government
List of MPs elected in the 1969 Ghanaian parliamentary election
Minister for Health (Ghana)
Minister for the Interior (Ghana)

References

1925 births
1998 deaths
Ghanaian MPs 1954–1956
Ghanaian MPs 1956–1965
Ghanaian MPs 1969–1972
Ghanaian Roman Catholics
Health ministers of Ghana
Interior ministers of Ghana
People from Upper East Region
Northern People's Party politicians